{{Speciesbox
| name = Evrotas minnow
| status = CR | status_system = IUCN3.1
| taxon = Pelasgus laconicus
| display_parents = 3
| authority = (Kottelat & Barbieri, 2004)
| synonyms = *Pseudophoxinus laconicus' Kottelat & Barbieri, 2004 
|status_ref= 
}}

The Evrotas minnow (Pelasgus laconicus''''') is a species of cyprinid fish.

It is found only in Greece.

Its natural habitats are rivers and freshwater springs.
It is threatened by habitat loss.

References

Pelasgus (fish)
Endemic fauna of Greece
Cyprinid fish of Europe
Taxa named by Maurice Kottelat
Fish described in 2004
Taxonomy articles created by Polbot